The 1879 Eastern Maori by-election was a by-election held on 7 July in the  electorate during the 6th New Zealand Parliament.

The by-election was caused by the death on 24 February of the incumbent MP Karaitiana Takamoana.

The by-election was won by Henare Tomoana.

Henare Matua was seen by some as the "Government candidate" and a leader of the "Repudiation" faction.

Results
The following table gives the election results:

References

Eastern Maori 1879
1879 elections in New Zealand
Māori politics